The following is a list of state highways in the U.S. state of Louisiana designated in the 550-599 range.


Louisiana Highway 550

Louisiana Highway 550 (LA 550) runs  in a north–south direction from LA 2 east of Bernice to the Arkansas state line north of Laran, Union Parish.

The route heads northeast from LA 2 and intersects LA 15 southeast of Spearsville.  LA 550 then curves northward and passes through Laran before crossing the Arkansas state line.  The road continues toward Hillsboro, Arkansas and US 82 as Union County Road 32.  It is an undivided two-lane highway for its entire length.

Louisiana Highway 551

Louisiana Highway 551 (LA 551) runs  in a north–south direction from LA 33 in Marion to LA 549 in Oakland, Union Parish.

The route heads northwest out of Marion, traversing a rural area and skirting the northeast side of the Union Wildlife Management Area. LA 551 is an undivided two-lane highway for its entire length.

Louisiana Highway 552

Louisiana Highway 553

Louisiana Highway 553 (LA 553) runs  in a north–south direction from US 165 in Monroe to LA 2 in Sterlington, Ouachita Parish.

Louisiana Highway 554

Louisiana Highway 554 (LA 554) runs  in an east–west direction from a junction with US 165 and LA 2 at Perryville to LA 138 southwest of Collinston.

The western terminus at US 165 and LA 2 is located on the Ouachita–Morehouse parish line.  From this point, the route heads eastward through Ouachita Parish for  before crossing Little Bayou Boeuf into Morehouse Parish.  LA 554 intersects LA 139, which connects to Monroe and Bastrop.  It continues eastward then makes a sharp curve to the south near its eastern terminus at LA 138.  LA 554 is an undivided two-lane highway for its entire length.

Louisiana Highway 555

Louisiana Highway 556

Louisiana Highway 557

Louisiana Highway 558

Louisiana Highway 558 (LA 558) runs  in a north–south direction along Iron Mountain Road from LA 15 in Mount Union to the Arkansas state line at Lockhart, Union Parish.

Just before crossing the state line, LA 558 intersects LA 3121 in Lockhart. It continues toward El Dorado, Arkansas and US 167 as Arkansas Highway 7. LA 558 is an undivided two-lane highway for its entire length.

Louisiana Highway 559

Louisiana Highway 560

Louisiana Highway 561

Louisiana Highway 562

Louisiana Highway 563

Louisiana Highway 564

Louisiana Highway 565

Louisiana Highway 566

Louisiana Highway 566 (LA 566) runs  in a southwest to northeast direction from US 84 at Elkhorn, Concordia Parish to a junction with LA 568 and LA 570 south of Waterproof, Tensas Parish.

It then curves slightly northeast to a point on the Tensas River known as Dunbarton. LA 566 turns east and roughly follows the river into the town of Clayton. Here, it intersects the concurrent US 425 and LA 15 at the foot of a twin bridge across the Tensas River. LA 566 curves to the north with the river and crosses from Concordia Parish into Tensas Parish.

Soon after crossing the parish line, LA 566 intersects LA 571, the route of which follows a semi-circle west of Waterproof.  LA 566 turns to the southeast at a second intersection with LA 571 and passes through Troy to a point on US 65 and LA 568 just southwest of Waterproof.  LA 566 officially proceeds with LA 568 a short distance further to an intersection with LA 570, but this portion of the route is signed in the field only as LA 568.

Louisiana Highway 567

Louisiana Highway 568

Louisiana Highway 569

Louisiana Highway 570

Louisiana Highway 571

Louisiana Highway 571 (LA 571) runs  in a southwest to northeast semi-circle from LA 566 north of Clayton to a second junction with LA 566 west of Waterproof, Tensas Parish.

Louisiana Highway 572

Louisiana Highway 573

Louisiana Highway 574

Louisiana Highway 575

Louisiana Highway 576

Louisiana Highway 577

Louisiana Highway 578

Louisiana Highway 579

Louisiana Highway 580

Louisiana Highway 581

Louisiana Highway 582

Louisiana Highway 583

Louisiana Highway 584

Louisiana Highway 584 (LA 584) runs  in an east–west direction from LA 135 to a point just east of LA 3048 in an area south of Rayville, Richland Parish.

Louisiana Highway 585

Louisiana Highway 585 (LA 585) runs  in a southwest to northeast direction from LA 134 west of Epps, Richland Parish to US 65 at Gassoway, East Carroll Parish.

The route heads due north from LA 134 and crosses from Richland Parish into West Carroll Parish.  It then zigzags northward across LA 2 at Goodwill to a point on the Boeuf River west of Oak Grove.  It then zigzags east and north to Fiske, where it begins to take a winding course parallel to the Boeuf River to LA 835 near Concord.  LA 585 curves eastward to Kilbourne, where it intersects LA 17 just south of the Arkansas state line.  The highway proceeds east across Bayou Macon into East Carroll Parish to its terminus at US 65 near Gassoway Lake.

Louisiana Highway 586

Louisiana Highway 587

Louisiana Highway 588

Louisiana Highway 589

Louisiana Highway 590

Louisiana Highway 591

Louisiana Highway 592

Louisiana Highway 593

Louisiana Highway 593 (LA 593) runs  in a north–south direction from LA 138 in Collinston to US 425 north of Bastrop.

The route heads northwest from Collinston and shortly intersects LA 3079.  It travels through sparsely populated areas until passing just west of the Morehouse Memorial Airport, entering the city of Bastrop.  LA 593 intersects LA 139, and the two highways run concurrently into the center of town, becoming a one-way couplet at the Morehouse General Hospital.  A few blocks later, LA 593 intersects the one-way couplet of US 165/US 425/LA 2, ending its concurrency with LA 139 and beginning one with US 425.  The one-way couplet ends two blocks to the north, and LA 593 splits from US 425 soon afterward.  North of town, LA 593 passes by the Morehouse Country Club, the Georgia Pacific Wildlife Management Area, and Bussy Brake, all to the west of the road.  LA 593 loops back to the east and ends at a final junction with US 425.

Louisiana Highway 594

Louisiana Highway 594 (LA 594) runs  in a general southwest to northeast direction from LA 15 in Monroe to LA 139 in Swartz, Ouachita Parish.

LA 594 initially heads northeast on Texas Avenue from LA 15, near the latter's intersection with US 165 Business.  The highway crosses over I-20 and immediately intersects 18th Street, connecting to a tight diamond interchange with the interstate.  LA 594 turns to the east parallel with I-20 and intersects mainline US 165 near the Pecanland Mall.  After a few miles, LA 594 reaches Millhaven and turns due north.  It intersects US 80 as it passes Ouachita Parish High School and continues north through Swartz to its terminus at LA 139.

LA 594 is an undivided two-lane highway for its entire length.

Louisiana Highway 595

Louisiana Highway 595 (LA 595) runs  in a north–south direction from a junction with US 80 and LA 133 in Start to the Richland–Morehouse parish line.

The route heads north from the concurrent US 80 and LA 133 in Start, a small community in northwestern Richland Parish.  After curving westward, LA 595 turns north at a T-intersection with a local road.  State maintenance ends at a bridge over Bayou Lafourche, which forms the boundary between Richland Parish and Morehouse Parish.  LA 595 is an undivided two-lane highway for its entire length.

Louisiana Highway 596

Louisiana Highway 596 (LA 596) runs  in a north–south direction from US 65 in Lake Providence to a second junction with US 65 at Panola, East Carroll Parish.

Louisiana Highway 597

Louisiana Highway 599

References

External links
La DOTD State, District, and Parish Maps